The 2013 Saudi Super Cup was the inaugural edition of the Saudi Super Cup, an annual Saudi football match played between the winners of the previous season's Saudi Pro League and King's Cup. Al-Fateh won the match 3–2 after extra time. It was played on 17 August 2013 by Al-Fateh, the winners of the 2012–13 Saudi Pro League, and Al-Ittihad, the winners of the 2013 King Cup of Champions. The match was held at the King Abdul Aziz Stadium in Mecca, Saudi Arabia. Al-Fateh defeated Al-Ittihad 3–2 after extra time to inaugural champions of the Saudi Super Cup.

Venue
The King Abdul Aziz Stadium was announced as the host of the final venue on 12 July 2013. This was the second domestic final to be held in the stadium.

The King Abdul Aziz Stadium was opened in 1986. The stadium was used as a venue for the 2005 Islamic Solidarity Games and hosted the final. It also hosted the 2011 Saudi Crown Prince Cup Final. Its current capacity is 33,000 and it is used by Al-Wehda as a home stadium.

Background

In 2012, Saudi Arabian Football Federation officially decided to launch the Saudi Super Cup following the conclusion of the 2011–12 season. The planned super cup match was set to be held between the 2011–12 Saudi Professional League winners, Al-Shabab and the 2012 King Cup of Champions winners, Al-Ahli. However, the 2012 Super Cup was canceled due to scheduling issues as no appropriate date for the match was found. The Saudi Arabian Football Federation decided to postpone the tournament and hold it in 2013.

Al-Fateh qualified by winning the 2012–13 Saudi Professional League, with 2 games to spare, following a 1–0 home win over Al-Ahli. Al-Ittihad qualified by winning their eighth King Cup title by defeating Al-Shabab 4–2 in the final. This was the 11th meeting between these two sides in all competitions. Both Al-Fateh and Al-Ittihad won four times each, while two draws occurred between them.

Match

Details

{| width="100%"
|valign="top" width="40%"|

Statistics

See also
 2012–13 Saudi Professional League
 2013 King Cup of Champions

References 

Saudi Super Cup
2013–14 in Saudi Arabian football
Sports competitions in Saudi Arabia
August 2013 sports events in Asia
Al-Fateh SC matches
Ittihad FC matches